Dwarskloof Pass, (English: Transverse Gap) is situated in the Western Cape, province of South Africa between Greyton and Caledon.

Mountain passes of the Western Cape